The Medal "For the Capture of Paris on March 19, 1814" was a campaign medal of the Russian Empire. It was established on August 30, 1814 by decree of Emperor Alexander I of Russia.

The medal was intended for those who participated in the taking of Paris in 1814, from soldiers to generals. The medal was not awarded until 1826 as after the restoration of the French monarchy Alexander I considered it undiplomatic to award a medal that would remind France of the defeat, and it was the next Emperor, Nicholas I, who gave orders for its issue in March 1826. More than 160,000 medals were produced in total.

References 

1814 establishments in the Russian Empire
1814 in France
Awards established in 1814
Campaign medals
Military awards and decorations of Russia